Dr. Phibes and the House of Wax Equations were an English psychedelic rock band, formed in 1989 in Crewe, Cheshire. They were composed of vocalist and guitarist Lawrence Howard King Jr., bassist Lee Patrick Belsham and drummer Keith York.

The band were regulars in the UK Indie Chart and had some links with other local bands in the North West. The band's name was linked to American actor Vincent Price who starred in House of Wax and the two Dr. Phibes films.

The band toured extensively around the UK and mainland Europe, including a major European tour featuring performances at rock festivals in France, Switzerland and Germany.

History
The band met whilst on a music course at South Cheshire College of Further Education in late 1989. King Jr. was born to Avril Fiona (née Sancho) and Lawrence Howard King Snr. in 1967 in Reading, Berkshire.  His parents married in 1965 in Enfield, Middlesex.

They released their first EP Sugarblast in 1990. This was followed up by their first album Whirlpool in 1991. A second EP, called Hazy Lazy Hologram, was released the same year.

The level of success continued with appearances at the Glastonbury Festival in 1992. Dr. Phibes also recorded Peel Sessions for the Radio One DJ John Peel in 1991 and 1993. They also recorded some tracks for  Mark Radcliffe's late night Radio 1 show. The band would release a further four EPs; their second album Hypnotwister came out in 1993.

Dr. Phibes' final live performance was in Manchester in 1995. Shortly afterwards the group folded.

In May 2017, it was announced via the band's Facebook fan page that bassist Lee Belsham had died of cancer at the age of 49. Born in 1968 in Chatham, Kent, Belsham was buried at St Mary's Church in Sandbach, Cheshire.

King Jr.'s incarceration

On 16 February 1997, Lawrence Howard King Jr. was charged by North Wales Police for the murder of his mother, Avril Fiona King, two days earlier at their shared home in Connah's Quay in north east Wales. King Jr., who stabbed and beat his mother, was jailed for life at Caernarfon Crown Court.

Discography
 Sugarblast, EP, 1990
 Whirlpool, LP, 1991
 Hazy Lazy Hologram, 12" single (came with free 7" radio edit single), 1991
 Mr. Phantasy (7 inch remix), EP, 1991 (France-only promo EP including "L.A. Woman")
 Misdiagnosedive, EP, 1992
 Hypnotwister, LP, 1993
 Deadpan Control Freak, EP, 1993
 Moment of Truth / Deadpan Control Freak, EP, 1993

References

External links
YouTube
Interview with the band in fanzine Obsolete
Reviews of albums
Reviews of albums
A blogpost with some memories of Dr. Phibes gigs

English psychedelic rock music groups
Musical groups established in 1990
Musical groups disestablished in 1995